Carmichaels is a borough in Greene County, Pennsylvania, United States. The population was 434 at the 2020 census, a decline from the figure of 483 tabulated in 2010.

History
The Carmichaels Covered Bridge and Greene Academy are listed on the National Register of Historic Places.

Carmichaels, Pennsylvania is quite famous in its area for the Coal Queen Pageant, an annual beauty pageant where girls from all over Greene County compete to be crowned Coal Queen.

Education
Carmichaels is home to the school district of Carmichaels Area. There is an Elementary Center and a Jr/Sr High School on the same grounds, home of the Mighty Mikes.

Geography
Carmichaels is located in eastern Greene County at  (39.897755, -79.975022). It is surrounded by Cumberland Township but is a separate municipality.

Pennsylvania Route 88 passes through the borough, leading north  to Fredericktown and south  to Point Marion.

Muddy Creek, a tributary of the Monongahela River, flows to the northeast through the northern corner of the borough, where it passes under the Carmichaels Covered Bridge on Old Town Road.

Demographics

As of the census of 2000, there were 556 people, 232 households, and 141 families residing in the borough. The population density was 3,021.2 people per square mile (1,192.6/km2). There were 255 housing units at an average density of 1,385.6 per square mile (547.0/km2). The racial makeup of the borough was 98.20% White, and 1.80% from two or more races. Hispanic or Latino of any race were 0.18% of the population.

There were 232 households, out of which 26.3% had children under the age of 18 living with them, 42.7% were married couples living together, 14.7% had a female householder with no husband present, and 38.8% were non-families. 34.5% of all households were made up of individuals, and 19.8% had someone living alone who was 65 years of age or older. The average household size was 2.36 and the average family size was 3.03.

In the borough the population was spread out, with 23.4% under the age of 18, 8.1% from 18 to 24, 27.3% from 25 to 44, 24.8% from 45 to 64, and 16.4% who were 65 years of age or older. The median age was 40 years. For every 100 females there were 93.1 males. For every 100 females age 18 and over, there were 84.4 males.

The median income for a household in the borough was $33,462, and the median income for a family was $36,719. Males had a median income of $29,286 versus $20,125 for females. The per capita income for the borough was $14,979. About 8.3% of families and 10.4% of the population were below the poverty threshold, including 12.4% of those under age 18 and 8.3% of those age 65 or over.

Electric generating station
Carmichaels is home to the Hill Top Energy Center. A newly constructed natural gas-fired power plant with a generating capacity of 625 megawatts, it is scheduled to begin operations in the summer of 2021.

Notable people
Todd Tamanend Clark, poet and composer, lived in Carmichaels from 1963 to 1965
Albert B. Cummins, the Progressive Era's Iowa governor and U.S. senator, born in Carmichaels in 1850
Richard Trumka, president of AFL–CIO since 2009 and previous president of United Mine Workers, born and raised in nearby Nemacolin and attended school in Carmichaels

References

External links
Carmichaels Area School District

Populated places established in 1768
Boroughs in Greene County, Pennsylvania
1768 establishments in Pennsylvania